Eternal Pictures was an American film distribution company, which distributed Christian, family and documentary films. The company distributed Tugger: The Jeep 4X4 Who Wanted To Fly in South Africa, and distributed Wemmicks, The Storykeepers and Hermie and Friends in Brazil.

Distribution filmography

Animation and Family 
Once Upon a Stable
The Lion of Judah
Tugger: The Jeep 4X4 Who Wanted To Fly
Going Wild, Going Green
Jungle Beat
The Legend of the Sky Kingdom

Drama 
The Visual Bible: Acts
The Visual Bible: Matthew
The Gospel of John
The Silent Fall

Documentary 
Xtreme Life
The Lazarus Phenomenon
The Final Frontier
Our Search for Sodom and Gomorrah
Real Discoveries Near the Dead Sea
Our Search for Tomb of Jesus

References

External links 
 Eternal Pictures at Facebook
 Eternal Pictures at Twitter

Film production companies of the United States
Christian film production companies
Coral Springs, Florida
Mass media companies established in 1998